The Province of German Bohemia was a province in Bohemia, now the Czech Republic, established for a short period of time after the First World War, as part of the Republic of German-Austria.

It included parts of northern and western Bohemia, at that time primarily populated by ethnic Germans. Important population centers were Reichenberg (now Liberec), Aussig (Ústí nad Labem), Teplitz-Schönau (Teplice), Dux (Duchcov), Eger (Cheb), Marienbad (Mariánské Lázně), Karlsbad (Karlovy Vary), Gablonz an der Neiße (Jablonec nad Nisou), Leitmeritz (Litoměřice), Brüx (Most) and Saaz (Žatec). The land that comprised the province would later form an integral part of the territory later known as the "Sudetenland".

History

Territories constituting modern German Bohemia were historically an integral part of the Duchy and Kingdom of Bohemia (itself part of the Holy Roman Empire from 1102), although with different ethnic development. Since the second half of the 13th century German settlers been invited by Bohemian kings and nobility into rarely populated border regions of Bohemia to develop these with skills acquired from the comparable landscapes of German states. For subsequent seven centuries Czech lands were characterized by "relationship and contending" (F. Palacký) between Slavic-Czech majority and substantial German minority. Relatively calm coexistence began ending with outbreak of the 1848 Revolution which also brought demands of German nationalists for unification of all German-speaking countries (i.e., in their conception, including Czech lands being then under the Habsburg rule) into one state – the demands which representatives of the Czech National Revival, although quite weak then, decisively refused. Remaining 70 years of existence Austrian and Austro-Hungarian Empire were fulfilled by increasing nationalist tensions and struggling between gradually strenghtening Bohemian-Czechs (c. 2/3 of all inhabitants of the Czech lands) and Bohemian-Germans.

With the imminent collapse of Habsburg Austria-Hungary at the end of First World War, Germans in areas of Bohemia with an ethnic German majority declared that they did not want to break away from Austria as the Czechs intended. On 27 October 1918, the Egerland declared independence from Bohemia and a day later the independence of Czechoslovak Republic was proclaimed in the Bohemian capital of Prague. On 11 November 1918, Emperor Charles I of Austria relinquished power and, on 12 November, ethnic German areas of the empire were declared to be part of new the Republic of German Austria, with the intent of unifying with the German Reich. Appealing to the principle of self-determination the Province of German Bohemia was formed from the part of Bohemia that contained primarily ethnic Germans. The capital of the province was at Reichenberg.

In 1919, the territory of the province was inhabited by 2.23 million ethnic Germans, and 116,275 ethnic Czechs.

Three other sister provinces were formed alongside German Bohemia, also made up of predominantly German-speaking parts:
Province of the Sudetenland (northeastern Bohemia proper, northern Moravia and western Austrian Silesia) – this province had radically different (smaller) boundaries than later conceptions of the term "Sudetenland"
German South Moravia (southern Moravia and southeastern Bohemia) – planned adjoining to Lower Austria
Bohemian Forest Region (southwestern Bohemia) – planned adjoining to Upper Austria

In 29 November 1918 the Czechoslovak army began an invasion of Province of German Bohemia and during December it occupied the whole region, with Reichenberg falling on 16 December and the last major city, Leitmeritz, falling on 27 December 1918. Other secessionist provinces faced the same fate.

The status of the German areas in Bohemia, Moravia, and Austrian Silesia was finally settled by the 1919 peace treaties of Versailles and Saint-Germain-en-Laye, which declared that the areas belong to solely to Czechoslovakia. The Czechoslovak government then granted amnesty for all activities against the new state. The region that had been German Bohemia was reintegrated into the Province of Bohemia (Země česká) of the Czechoslovak Republic. German Bohemians had however hoped that the new state would be built as a Swiss-type decentralized state, which had been implied by Czech officials to appease the Western Allies on the woeful status of the large minorities.

Later development (1938–45)
According to the Munich Agreement Czechoslovakia was forced to give up the German-inhabited areas of its domain, at the behest of Nazi Germany. The Nazis would incorporate the former German Bohemia into the Reichsgau Sudetenland, a new administrative unit that contained northern parts of German-speaking areas of the former Bohemian Crown. Around 165,000 Czechs who lived in these areas quickly fled (or were forced to flee) in fear of reprisals by the Sudetendeutsches Freikorps, a Nazi-sponsored militia. A half year later, however, Germany invaded the remaining parts of the Czech lands (in German called Rest-Tschechei, "Remaining Czechia"), and carved out new puppet state from the formerly independent country.

After the war, all of this land was reincorporated into renewed Czechoslovak Republic. The vast majority of the German population (more than 94%) were expelled from Czechoslovak territory: many were killed or died during their flight from both Czech and Soviet attackers.

See also
Republic of German-Austria
Origins of Czechoslovakia
Province of the Sudetenland
German South Moravia
Bohemian Forest Region

References

Further reading
 de Zayas, Alfred M.: A terrible Revenge. Palgrave/Macmillan, New York, 1994. .
 de Zayas, Alfred M.: Nemesis at Potsdam. London, 1977. .
 Douglas, R.M.: Orderly and Humane. The Expulsion of the Germans after the Second World War. Yale University Press 2012. .
 Franzel, Emil: Sudetendeutsche Geschichte. Mannheim, 1978. .
 Meixner, Rudolf: Geschichte der Sudetendeutschen. Nürnberg, 1988. .

Bohemia
Sudetenland
Republic of German-Austria
States and territories disestablished in 1918
States and territories established in 1918
1918 establishments in Europe
1918 disestablishments in Europe